Vladimir Saruhanyan is an Armenian amateur boxer.

Saruhanyan won a bronze medal at the 2011 European Amateur Boxing Championships in the lightweight division.

References

Living people
Lightweight boxers
Armenian male boxers
Year of birth missing (living people)
21st-century Armenian people